All Fall Down is a 1960 novel by James Leo Herlihy, which was adapted into a 1962 film of the same name directed by John Frankenheimer.

Plot introduction
The wealthy Williams family is torn apart from within once they invite Echo in.

Explanation of the novel's title
The novel's title is meant to draw attention to the effect of the self-motivated, destructive passions unleashed within the family home in the course of its story.

Plot summary
When the hedonistic Berry-Berry Williams deserts his pregnant lover, Echo O'Brien, his younger brother Clinton's blind faith in him shows signs of waning, while his parents are disgusted by Berry-Berry's actions.

The book goes back and forth from third person to first person (Clinton's diaries).

Characters
Berry-Berry Williams – protagonist
Clinton Williams – younger brother to Berry
Ralph Williams – father
Annabel Williams – mother
Echo O'Brien – family guest who becomes pregnant by Berry

Film adaptation
The 1962 film, directed by John Frankenheimer, stars Eva Marie Saint as Echo O'Brien, Warren Beatty as Berry-Berry, Karl Malden as Ralph, Brandon deWilde as Clinton and Angela Lansbury as Annabel.

Release details
1960, USA, Dutton ?, Pub date ? ? 1960, Hardback
1961, UK, Faber and Faber , Pub date ? December 1961, Hardback
1970, UK, Sphere , Pub date 16 July 1970, Paperback
1990, USA, Donald I Fine , Pub date ? September 1990, Paperback

Novels by James Leo Herlihy
1960 American novels
American novels adapted into films
E. P. Dutton books
1960 debut novels